Gowjar or Gujar may refer to:
Gowjar, Kerman
Gowjar, West Azerbaijan